Helmut Bieler (7 June 1940 in Gersfeld, Hesse-Nassau – 11 January 2019 in Rimsting) was a German composer and pianist.
He studied composition with Franz Xaver Lehner and Fritz Schieri, piano with Friedrich Wührer and Aldo Schoen and learned music at the University for Music and Performing Arts, Munich. From 1967 to 1979 he taught at the Markgräfin-Wilhelmine-Gymnasium, Bayreuth. In 1979 he became a docent and 1988 a professor of music education at the University of Bayreuth. He founded the Ensemble Musica Viva (Bayreuth) in 1980 and the Bayreuth Days of Contemporary Music in 1988. His music has been performed in Europe (e.g. Gaudeamus Muziekweek and ISCM World Music Days Festival in Aarhus, Ensemble Sortisatio), Russia and the USA.

Prizes 
 1980: Prize for the Promotion of Culture by the City of Nuremberg
 1992: Cultural Prize of the City of Bayreuth
 2008: Friedrich Baur Prize of the Bavarian Academy of Fine Arts

References

External links 
 Helmut Bieler at The Living Composers Project
 Helmut Bieler at the International Weeks for Contemporary Music Lüneburg

1940 births
2019 deaths
People from Fulda (district)
People from Hesse-Nassau
German classical composers
German classical pianists
Male classical pianists
German schoolteachers
20th-century classical composers
German male classical composers
20th-century German composers
German male pianists
21st-century classical pianists
20th-century German male musicians
21st-century German male musicians